The 2009 Zucchetti Kos Tennis Cup was a professional tennis tournament played on outdoor red clay courts. It was the sixth edition of the tournament which was part of the Tretorn SERIE+ of the 2009 ATP Challenger Tour. It took place in Cordenons, Italy between 10 and 16 August 2009.

Singles entrants

Seeds

 Rankings are as of August 3, 2009.

Other entrants
The following players received wildcards into the singles main draw:
  Daniele Bracciali
  Gastón Gaudio
  Jeremy Jahn

The following players received entry from the qualifying draw:
  Pablo Martín-Adalia
  Benoît Paire
  Matteo Trevisan
  Adrian Ungur
  Daniel Yoo (as a Lucky Loser)

Champions

Singles

 Peter Luczak def.  Olivier Rochus, 6–3, 3–6, 6–1

Doubles

 James Cerretani /  Travis Rettenmaier def.  Peter Luczak /  Alessandro Motti, 4–6, 6–3, [11–9]

References
Official website
ITF Search 

Zucchetti Kos Tennis Cup
Tretorn SERIE+ tournaments
Clay court tennis tournaments
Internazionali di Tennis del Friuli Venezia Giulia
Zucchetti